Tank is the fifth studio album by British alternative electronica band Asian Dub Foundation.

Track listing
 Flyover (4:17)
 Tank (5:36)
 Hope (5:09)
 Round Up (4:36)
 Oil (4:33)
 Powerlines (4:34)
 Who Runs the Place (4:11)
 Take Back the Power (4:27)
 Warring Dhol (5:54) 
 Tomorrow Begins Today (3:59)
 Melody 7 (6:14)

References

2005 albums
Asian Dub Foundation albums
EMI Records albums